Guzeriplia is a genus of flies in the family Dolichopodidae. It is known from southern Russia, Georgia, China and Turkey. It is considered a synonym of Chrysotimus by some authors, but is considered a separate genus by others.

Species
Four species are included in the genus:
 Guzeriplia beijingensis Yang & Saigusa, 2001 – China: Beijing
 Guzeriplia chlorina Negrobov, 1968 – Georgia, Russia (southern European part, Caucasus: Adygea, North Ossetia-Alania, Kabardino-Balkaria, Karachay-Cherkessia, Krasnodar Territory, Stavropol Territory), Turkey
 Guzeriplia turcica Naglis & Negrobov, 2021 – Turkey
 Guzeriplia viridana Negrobov, 1978 – Russia (southern European part, Caucasus: Adygea, Karachay-Cherkessia, Krasnodar Territory)

References 

Dolichopodidae genera
Peloropeodinae
Diptera of Europe
Diptera of Asia